The Big Culvert is a substantial granite and bluestone arch culvert bridge on the historic Yarra Track near , Victoria, Australia.

It was built in the 1870s as part of the improvements to the road from Melbourne to the Woods Point and Jordan Goldfields. It was probably designed by Clement Wilks who was also responsible for the design of the Wilks Creek Bridge near Marysville also on the "Yarra Track". This moss covered granite and bluestone arch was constructed by a German settlor, George Koehler, who operated a hotel nearby.

The bridge is listed on the National Trust of Australia (Victoria) Register: B5804 and on the (now defunct) Register of the National Estate: Place 5720); and was previously listed on the Victorian Heritage Inventory.

References

Bibliography
 Cumming, D.A. Some Public Works Engineers in Victoria in the Nineteenth Century  Technology Report No. TR-85/10. August 1985.
 Thomas, Ann. Wilks Creek Bridge at Marysville, Victoria. 1993.
 Stacpoole, H. (Ed). Tracks to the Jordan. Lowden, Kilmore, 1973.

External links
 Obituary: Clement Wilks, 1819-1871  Minutes of the Proceedings of the Institution of Civil Engineers, Vol.33 January 1872 pp.275-276 - Thomas Telford-ICE Virtual Library 

Road bridges in Victoria (Australia)
Bridges completed in 1870
1870 establishments in Australia
Transport in Victoria (Australia)
Stone arch bridges in Australia